

The Philadelphia Bourse was a commodities exchange founded in 1891 by George E. Bartol, a grain and commodities exporter, who modeled it after the Bourse in Hamburg, Germany. The steel-framed building – one of the first to be constructed – was built from 1893 to 1895, and was designed by G. W. & W. D. Hewitt in the Beaux-Arts style.  Carlisle redstone, Pompeian buff brick and terra cotta were all used in the facade.  The building was sold in 1979 to Kaiserman Company and underwent extensive renovations, bringing the internal usable surface to approximately 286,000 square feet (26,000 square meters). In 2016, MRP Realty took ownership of the building and spent $40 million renovating it. MRP Realty owns the building as part of a three-building collection named The Independence Portfolio, which also includes 325 Chestnut and 400 Market Street—both located within a block of The Bourse. The building is home to nine floors of office space which includes a Mexican Consulate. There is also a food hall on the first floor which opened on 15 November 2018.

History

Upon his return from a European trip in 1890, Bartol organized the Philadelphia business community. He asked each new member to pledge $1,000 to the project. The Bourse motto was "Buy, Sell, Ship via Philadelphia."

The Bourse stopped functioning as a commodities exchange in the 1960s. The structure continued to serve as an office building until 1979, when it was sold and renovated to include upscale retail space on floors near the street level. The upper levels of the building continued to house office space.  A movie theater specializing in independent films, The Ritz at the Bourse, sits across the street at 4th and Ranstead streets.

In 2018, a two-year rehabilitation created a brand new food hall with 30 vendors.

The building is listed on the National Register of Historic Places.

Today 
After a two-year rehabilitation, The Bourse reopened as a modern food hall with 30 vendors in November, 2018.  The food hall is open seven days a week and features foods from around the world as well as local specialties like the cheesesteak.

Food Hall Vendors 

 #GetFried Fry Cafe (French Fries)
 Abunai Poké (Hawaiian)
 Art Star at the Bourse (Handmade Goods)
 Baby Buns (Sliders)
 Barry's Buns (Bakery)
 Bricco Pizza Romana (Pizza)
 Bluebird Distilling (Cocktails and Liquor)
 Bronze Table by Vera Pasta (Italian)
 Escape the 1980s (Escape Room)
 Freebyrd Chicken (Fried Chicken)
 Grubhouse (All-Day Breakfast)
 Lalo (Filipino)
 Marino Bros. Cheesesteaks (Philadelphia Cheesesteaks)
 Menagerie Coffee (Coffee)
 Mighty Melt (Artisan Sandwiches)
 Photo Pop Philly (Interactive Pop-Up)
 Pinch Dumplings (Dumplings)
 Prescription Chicken (Soup and Comfort Food)
 Scoop DeVille (Ice Cream)
 Rebel Taco (Mexican)
 Rustica Rosticceria (Italian Classics)
 Takorean (Korean Fusion)

Other Tenants 

 Diversified Lighting
 MakeOffices
 Mexican Consulate
 Piano
 Society Hill Dental
 NeuroFlow
 Jasonxpan
 Allen & Gerritsen

See also

References
Notes

External links

Official Site for The Bourse Food Hall
Official Site for The Bourse (whole building)
Official site for The Independence Portfolio (three building collection that includes The Bourse)
Virtual tour of the Bourse Food Hall
Listing and photographs at the Historic American Buildings Survey

Organizations established in 1891
1960s disestablishments in the United States
Commercial buildings completed in 1895
Buildings and structures in Philadelphia
Beaux-Arts architecture in Pennsylvania
1891 establishments in Pennsylvania
Old City, Philadelphia